Francis Cholle is a French-born writer.

Biography
Francis was born in France, attended and graduated from HEC Paris. He moved to New York, when he was 28. As an academic, he has taught at HEC Paris, Fashion Institute of Technology, and Columbia Business School.

In 2011, Francis published The Intuitive Compass, which describes his approach, called intuitive compass. Previously, he wrote a book named, L'intelligence intuitive: Pour réussir autrement.

In 2020, Francis wrote a book called Squircle: A New Way to Think for a New World. In the book, Francis discusses the human predisposition to dismiss non-rational thought processes, including intuition, emotion, feeling, inspiration, and aspiration. To combat this, he proposed a new method called Squircle. The book had been included in USA Today and The Wall Street Journal'''s best-selling book lists.

Bibliography
 L'intelligence intuitive: Pour réussir autrement (2007)
 The Intuitive Compass (2011)
 Squircle: A New Way to Think for a New World'' (2020)

References

External links
 Official website

Living people
21st-century French writers
Year of birth missing (living people)